Namita Chandel (born 10 February 1993 in Seoni) is an Indian canoeist, who won four gold medals at the National Canoe Sprint Championship in 2016 and one in 2017. She represented India at the 2022 Asian Canoe Sprint Championships, where she was part of a bronze-winning team in the C-4 200m discipline.

Early life
Namita Chandel is from Chhapara, a small village in Madhya Pradesh, who regularly had to cross a river to attend school. She enrolled in the Madhya Pradesh water sports academy, whose only admission criterion was that the applicants know swimming, in 2011.

Career
Namita initially trained for kayaking but later switched to canoeing. She represented India in the 2014 Asian Games. She won her first international medal at the Asian Canoe Sprint and Dragon Boat Championship in Indonesia in 2015.

Achievements
 Represented India, Obstacle Slalom, Asian Games, Incheon, 2014
 Silver medal, Mixed 200m, Asian Canoe Sprint & Dragon Boat Championship, Indonesia, 2015
 Gold medal, C-2 500m, National Canoe Sprint Championship, Bhopal, 2018
 Represented India, C-1 events, ICF Canoe Sprint World Championships, Szeged, 2019
 4 x Gold medals, C-4 (1000m, 500m, 200m) and C-2 (500m) events, National Canoe Sprint Championship, Bhopal, 2020
 3 x Gold medals, C-4 (500m) and C-2 (500m, 200m), National Canoe Sprint Championship, Bilaspur, 2021
 Gold medal - C-2 (5000m), 2 x Silver medals - C-2 (500m, 200m) and Bronze medal - C-4 (200m), National Canoe Sprint Championship, Bhopal, 2022
 Bronze medal, C-4 (200m), Asian Canoe Sprint Championships, Rayong, 2022

References 

1993 births
Living people
Indian female canoeists
Canoeists at the 2014 Asian Games
Asian Games competitors for India